Alyssa is a feminine given name with multiple origins. Alysa is an alternative spelling. 

As used in Western countries, the name is usually derived from the name of the flower alyssum. The name of the flower derives from the Greek ἀ- a- ("not") and λύσσα lyssa ("mania"); the flower was formerly thought to cure skin diseases. It shares many variants in common with the name Alice and is occasionally considered a form of that name as well.

Other equivalents of Alice include Alisa and Alissa. Elissa (Arabic: اليسار / ALA-LC: Alīssār; اليسا / Alīssā; عليسا ‘Alīssā; عليسة / ‘Alīssah) are variations of the name of Queen Elissa, the founder of Carthage, used in Middle Eastern countries.

The name has been popular in the United States, where it ranked among the top 20 names between 2000 and 2009. The name's popularity declined steadily throughout the next decade, and by 2020 its rank had fallen to 199.

Notables with the name Alyssa
Alyssa A. Goodman (born 1962), American astronomer, scientist, and college professor
Alyssa Adams, American editor and graphic designer
Alyssa Alano (born 1987), Philippine-Australian film and television actress and host
Alyssa Anderson (born 1990), American competition swimmer
Alyssa Ashley Nichols (born 1984), birth name of American actress Indigo
Alyssa Ayres, American college dean
Alyssa Baldin (born 1990), Canadian elite ice hockey player
Alyssa Bannan (born 2002), Australian rules footballer
Alyssa Barlow, former member of American Christian rock and CCM band BarlowGirl
Alyssa Baumann (born 1998), American gymnast
Alyssa Beckerman (born 1981), American former gymnast
Alyssa Boey (born 1996), Malaysian tennis player
Alyssa Bonagura (born 1988), American singer-songwriter
Alyssa Brown (born 1989), Canadian artistic gymnast
Alyssa Brugman (born 1974), Australian writer and novelist
Alyssa Budhoo (born 1991), Canadian-Guyanese former footballer
Alyssa Bull (born 1995), Australian canoeist
Alyssa Bustamante, American murderer
Alyssa Campanella (born 1990), American beauty queen
Alyssa Carson (born 2001), American space enthusiast
Alyssa Cecere (born 1987), Canadian professional ice hockey player
Alyssa Chia (born 1974), Taiwanese actress and television host
Alyssa Cole (born 1982), American author
Alyssa Conley (born 1991), South African athlete
Alissa Crans, American mathematician
Alyssa Cruz Aguero, Guamanian beauty pageant contestant
Alyssa Diaz (born 1985), American actress
Alyssa Edwards (born 1980), American drag queen
Alyssa Farah (born 1989), American political advisor
Alyssa Fleming (born 1994), American lacrosse player
Alyssa Gagliardi (born 1992), American ice hockey player
Alyssa George (born 1985), American beauty pageant competitor
Alyssa Gialamas (born 1995), American Paralympic swimmer
Alyssa Giannetti (born 1994), American professional footballer
Alyssa Graham, American singer-songwriter
Alyssa Hayden (born 1970), Australian politician
Alyssa Healy (born 1990), Australian women’s cricketer
Alyssa Howard, pseudonym of American writing partners Eileen Buckholtz, Ruth Glick, Carolyn Males, and Louise Titchener
Alyssa Jacey (born 1981), American singer-songwriter and former dancer
Alyssa Kleiner (born 1993), American soccer player
Alyssa Lagonia (born 1989), Canadian professional soccer player
Alyssa Lampe (born 1988), American freestyle wrestler
Alyssa LaRoche (born 1979), American entrepreneur, machinimaker, fashion designer, journalist, scenographer, and author
Alyssa Leonard, American lacrosse player
Alyssa Lim (born 1991), English badminton player
Alyssa Manley (born 1994), American field hockey player
Alyssa Mastromonaco (born 1976), American spokeswoman and former government official
Alyssa Mautz (born 1989), American professional soccer player
Alyssa Mayo (born 2000), American tennis player
Alyssa McClelland (born 1981), Australian director, writer, and actress
Alyssa Mendonsa (born 1990/1991), Indian playback singer
Alyssa Micaela (born 1992), American country singer-songwriter
Alyssa Mifsud (born 1994), Australian rules footballer
Alyssa Milano (born 1972), American actress, producer, singer, author, and activist
Alyssa Miller (born 1989), American model
Alyssa Monks (born 1977), American painter
Alyssa Murray (born 1992), American professional lacrosse player
Alyssa Naeher (born 1988), American soccer player
Alyssa Nakken (born 1990), American professional baseball coach
Alyssa Nicole Pallett (born 1985), Canadian model, actress, and businesswoman
Alyssa Oviedo (born 2000), American-born Dominican footballer
Alyssa Parker (born 1994), American field hockey player
Alyssa Peterson (1976-2003), American Army soldier
Alyssa Ramsey (born 1982), American former soccer player
Alyssa Reid (born 1993), Canadian singer-songwriter
Alyssa Rosenzweig, Canadian software engineer
Alyssa Rubino, Canadian singer
Alyssa Saufika, member of musical group Blink Indonesia
Alyssa Soebandono (born 1991), Indonesian actress, presenter, and singer
Alyssa Spellman, American beauty pageant contestant
Alyssa Stephens (born 1998), birth name of American rapper Latto
Alyssa Stringfellow (born 1985), New Zealand actress, model, and musician
Alyssa Sutherland (born 1982), Australian actress
Alyssa Thomas (born 1992), American professional basketball player
Alyssa Tirtosentono (born 2000), Dutch badminton player
Alyssa Underwood, Australian former cricketer
Alyssa Valdez (born 1993), Filipino volleyball player
Alyssa Wohlfeiler (born 1989), American ice hockey player
Alyssa Wong, American writer

Notables with the name Alysa
Alysa Stanton (born circa 1964), African-American rabbi
Alysa Liu (born 2005), American figure skater
Alysa King, Canadian actress
Alysa Nahmias, American director, producer, and writer

Characters
Alyssa Moy, from “Fantastic Four” comics

References

Feminine given names
Given names derived from plants or flowers